The Inoceramidae are an extinct family of bivalves ("clams") in the Class Mollusca. Fossils of inoceramids are found in marine sediments of Permian to latest Cretaceous in age. Inoceramids tended to live in upper bathyal and neritic environments. Many species of inoceramid are found all over the world, demonstrating the wide distribution of their preferred ecosystems, and possibly long-lived planktotrophic larvae. Despite their wide distribution, the pace of evolution of inoceramids was great, with species ranges commonly averaging 0.2-0.5 Ma.

Size 

Various species of inoceramids have achieved shell sizes ranging from small to large. Members of the Inoceramus and Cladoceramus genera have shells of more than 1 m in length. In 1952, the huge specimen of Inoceramus steenstrupi 187 cm long, was found in Qilakitsoq, the Nuussuaq Peninsula, Greenland. This fossil is 83 Ma old, the Upper Santonian or Lower Campanian stage.

Taxonomy
Inoceramidae Giebel 1852
Genus Actinoceramus Meek, 1864 (Synonym = Birostrina De Luc & Sowerby, 1821)
Genus Anopaea Eichwald, 1861
Genus Arctomytiloides Polubotko, 1992
Genus Cataceramus Cox, 1969
Genus Cladoceramus Seitz, 1961
Genus Cremnoceramus Heinz, 1932
Genus Endocostea Whitfield, 1877
Genus Inoceramus Sowerby, 1814
Subgenus Inoceramus (Cordiceramus) (Heinz, 1932)
Subgenus Inoceramus (Inoceramus) Sowerby, 1814
Subgenus Inoceramus (Sphenoceramus) (Böhm, 1915)
Genus Magadiceramus Heinz, 1932
Genus Mytiloides Brongniart, 1822
Genus Neocomiceramus Pokhialainen, 1972
Genus Neoinoceramus Ihering, 1902
Genus Parainoceramus Voronetz, 1936
Genus Platyceramus Heinz, 1932
Genus Pseudomytiloides Koschelkina, 1963
Genus Retroceramus Koschelkina, 1958
Genus Spyridoceramus Cox, 1969
Genus Tethyoceramus Sornay, 1980
Genus Trochoceramus Heinz, 1932
Genus Volviceramus Stoliczka, 1871

Footnotes

Further reading 
 Lower Turonian Euramerican Inoceramidae: A morphologic, taxonomic, and biostratigraphic overview. A report from the first Workshop on Early Turonian Inoceramids (Oct. 5-8, 1992) in Hamburg, Germany; organized by Heinz Hilbrecht and Peter J. Harries.

 
Prehistoric bivalve families
Permian first appearances
Late Cretaceous extinctions